The Katekhi Church is a Georgian Orthodox Church located in the village of Katex of Balakan District, northwestern Azerbaijan, on the border with Georgia.

See also
Church of Kish

References

Sources 
 დიმიტრი ჯანაშვილი (ინგილო ჯანაშვილი) — გეოგრაფიული და ისტორიული აღწერა ჰერეთისა // მოგზაური. - 1901. - N10. - გვ.937-945

External links 
 კატეხის ტაძარი - ვიდეო

Eastern Orthodox churches in Azerbaijan